is a compilation album by the Irish pop group The Nolans. Released on 19 July 2017 exclusively in Japan by Pony Canyon, the album consists of 18 English-language covers of popular J-pop songs recorded throughout the group's career.

Track listing

References

External links
 

2017 compilation albums
The Nolans albums
Covers albums
Pony Canyon compilation albums